Miloš Bajić (1915 - 1995) was a Serbian Modernist painter, who is considered to be the founder of abstract painting in Yugoslavia.

Early life
Miloš Bajić was born in 1915 in Resanovci, a village in the Condominium of Bosnia and Herzegovina in Austria-Hungary (now Bosnia and Herzegovina).  In 1922, Bajić moved to Belgrade, the capital of Yugoslavia (now Serbia), where he completed grammar school and teacher school. As a student, he published illustrations and caricatures in the daily Politika and satirical magazine Ošišani jež. In 1935, Bajić became one of Petar Dobrović's students, finishing his first year in Beta Vukanović's class at the Belgrade School of Arts in 1937.

World War II
After Kingdom of Yugoslavia was invaded by the Axis powers of Germany, Italy, Hungary, and Bulgaria in 1941, Bajić joined the Partisans, Yugoslav anti-Nazi resistance movement. Occupying forces captured him in Belgrade in October 1942 and imprisoned him in Banjica Concentration Camp. In September 1944, he was transferred to Mauthausen concentration camp.

While in detention, Bajić captured the scenes from prison life as drawings. and later said about his work:

After the liberation of the camp by American forces, Bajić returned to Belgrade with about 150 drawings and continued his education at University of Arts in Belgrade.

Later years
In 1949, he graduated from the Academy of Arts in Belgrade in the class of Milo Milunović, Ivan Tabaković, and Nedeljko Gvozdenović. After finishing his specialist training with Marko Čelebonović, he became one of the first assistant professors at the Belgrade Academy of Arts and worked as a professor until he retired in 1979. Numerous distinguished Serbian painters were students in professor Bajić’s class.

He was a member of the groups “Independent” (1951–55) and "The December Group" (1955-60), which used modernism as a way of fighting socialist realism. He had his first individual exhibition at the ULUS Gallery in Belgrade in 1952.

He participated in founding the Art Colony in Bačka Topola (1953). This is where he completed his first large format mosaic and obelisk dedicated to the space conquest. His later work is characterised by numerous mosaics and fresco paintings (compositions in space), and particularly the memorial construction Partisan Necropolis in Resanovci (1971). In 1967, he exhibited for the first time the new cycle of large format Mauthausen paintings, inspired by the drawings he made during his time in the concentration camp.

In 1975, Bajić published monograph “Mauthausen 106621”. In the preface, he said:

Miloš Bajić received several national and international awards, decorations and honours. His works are today displayed in numerous museums. Most of his authentic drawings and paintings from the cycle Mauthausen are stored in carefully guarded family collection.

Family
His son is well-known Serbian film director Darko Bajić.

Mauthauzen Collection

References

1915 births
1995 deaths
Serbian painters
Abstract painters
Modern painters
Mosaic artists
Fresco painters
University of Arts in Belgrade alumni
Mauthausen concentration camp survivors
Yugoslav Partisans members
Yugoslav prisoners of war
People from Bosansko Grahovo
Serbs of Bosnia and Herzegovina